Princeton Architectural Press (now PA Press) is a division of Chronicle Books.  

Founded by Kevin Lippert  in 1981 in Princeton, NJ, PA Press has been a leading publisher of books on architecture, design, and visual culture for over forty years, making its reputation by identifying new trends and publishing first books on emerging talents, as well as definitive works on established names, and by creating books of unsurpassed design quality and production values. 

The Press, now based in New York City, has since broadened its scope to include new nonfiction book categories such as nature, gardening, cookbooks, pop culture, and more, and introduced illustrated children's books and fine stationery and puzzle products to its publishing program. 

PA Press is not related to or affiliated with Princeton University Press.

References

External links
 Princeton Architectural Press website
 "Building Books: PAPress" (interview with PAPress Publisher Kevin Lippert), Archinect, December 3, 2004.

Book publishing companies based in New York (state)
Visual arts publishing companies
Publishing companies established in 1981